The 2002 Biathlon Junior World Championships was held in Ridnaun-Val Ridanna, Italy from January 30 to February 3, 2002. There was to be a total of 16 competitions: sprint, pursuit, individual, and relay races for men and women.

Medal winners

Youth Women

Junior Women

Youth Men

Junior Men

Medal table

References 

Biathlon Junior World Championships
2002 in biathlon
2002 in Italian sport
International sports competitions hosted by Italy
2002 in youth sport